One Summer Love, originally titled Dragonfly, is a 1976 romantic drama film directed by Gilbert Cates from a screenplay by N. Richard Nash. It stars Beau Bridges and Susan Sarandon and features Mildred Dunnock and Ann Wedgeworth.

Plot
After being released from a mental hospital, Jesse (Bridges) sets out to find and rejoin his off-beat family. While doing so, he meets a pretty young woman named Chloe (Sarandon) who works in a movie theatre, and they fall in love, which resolves his psychological problems.

Cast
Beau Bridges as Jesse Arlington
Susan Sarandon as Chloe Farna
James Noble as Dr. Lee
Harriet Rogers as Mrs. Patterson
Ann Wedgeworth as Pearlie Greyhound
Linda Miller as Willa Arlington
Martin Burke as Lonny Arlington
Michael B. Miller as Gabe
Mildred Dunnock as Miss Barrow

References

External links

1976 films
1976 romantic drama films
American International Pictures films
American romantic drama films
Films directed by Gilbert Cates
Films set in Connecticut
Films shot in Connecticut
Films with screenplays by N. Richard Nash
1970s English-language films
1970s American films